Barabas, an alternative spelling of Barabbas, may refer to:
People
Miklós Barabás, the Hungarian painter
Tom Barabas, American-Hungarian pianist/keyboardist
Sari Barabas, a Hungarian operatic soprano
A. P. Barabas, a British surgeon, a namesake of the Sack–Barabas syndrome
Enikő Barabás, Romanian rower

Fictional characters
Karabas Barabas, a villain in the Russian children's story The Golden Key, or the Adventures of Buratino
Barabas (character) the lead character of the Christopher Marlowe play The Jew of Malta
Places
Barabás, a village in Hungary
Music
"Barabas", a song from Hooverphonic

See also
Barabash
Barabbas (disambiguation)
Barrabas (disambiguation)